Hieronymus Bosch (c. 1450–1516) was a Netherlandish draughtsman and painter.

Hieronymus Bosch may also refer to:
Hieronymus Bosch (band), a band from New Zealand
Hieronymus de Bosch (1740–1811), Dutch poet
Harry Bosch, a fictional detective from Michael Connelly's novels

Bosch, Hieronymus